The 2017 State of the Nation Address was the second State of the Nation Address delivered by President Rodrigo Duterte.

Preparations 
3000 people were invited to attend the second State of the Nation Address of President Rodrigo Duterte. President Duterte rehearsed his speech and wished to deliver it without the help of a teleprompter.

Seating and guests 
Former presidents Fidel V. Ramos, Joseph Estrada, and Gloria Macapagal Arroyo have attended the event. The attendees were invited to wear barongs, Filipiniana dresses, and Mindanao-inspired outfits.

References 

State of the Nation Address
2017 speeches
2017
Presidency of Rodrigo Duterte
Speeches by Rodrigo Duterte